Charles de Vintimille (2 September 1741 – 24 February 1814), marquis du Luc, was a French aristocrat and governor. He was the illegitimate son of Pauline Félicité de Mailly and king Louis XV of France and known as Demi-Louis ('Little Louis') because of his visual resemblance to his alleged biological father Louis XV.

Life
After the death of his mother, Charles de Vintimille was raised by his aunt Louise Julie de Mailly until the baptism of December 19, 1742, in the castle of the legitimate father Jean Baptiste de Vintimille, in Savigny-sur-Orge. The king never paid him any personal attention.

His father's mistress Madame de Pompadour wished to arrange a marriage between Charles de Vintimille and her daughter Alexandrine Le Normant d'Étiolles, but the king would not allow it.

He made a career in the royal regiment in Corsica, where he became a captain, lieutenant and governor of Porquerolles (1759), and later a Maréchal de camp (1780) and a knight of the Order of Saint Louis. He married Adélaïde de Castellane (1746-1770) in 1764, with whom he had three children.

References

1741 births
1814 deaths
18th-century French military personnel
19th-century French people
Knights of the Order of Saint Louis
Illegitimate children of Louis XV
Sons of kings